Santillane is a historic home located near Fincastle, Botetourt County, Virginia. It was built in 1795, and consists of a two-story high, three bay by four bay, main block with a one-story, rear kitchen wing. It is constructed of brick and is in the Greek Revival style.  The house has a shallow hipped roof and tetrastyle two-story front portico dated to the early 20th century.  Also on the property is a contributing stone spring house.  The house stands on a tract purchased by Colonel George Hancock (1754–1820) in 1795.  The kitchen wing may date to his period of ownership.

It was listed on the National Register of Historic Places in 1974.

References

Houses on the National Register of Historic Places in Virginia
Greek Revival houses in Virginia
Houses completed in 1835
Houses in Botetourt County, Virginia
National Register of Historic Places in Botetourt County, Virginia